Newari numerals are part of Newari language. The numbers can be represented in four different ways - in words, in numerals, by symbols or by allusion.

Words
As in every language in Newari also we can represent numbers in words. The way of writing can be different according to different Newari scripts but pronunciation is the same (excluding the dialects).

Numerals
As in every language in Newari also we can represent numbers in numerals. Numerals vary according to different Newari scripts.
The numerals of Nepal Bhasa in ranjana script goes in this way:-

Symbols
Different symbols are used to represent numerals in this system. It is a unique system of numerals among Newar people. This system was mostly used in Malla era.

Allusion
Different allusions are used to represent numerals in this system. It is also a unique system of numerals among Newars. This was also used in ancient period. In this system numbers are represented with universal truth. For example, to represent "1", there is one mouth and is a universal truth. So "म्हुतु" (mhutu) meaning mouth is used for one. We can use any universal truth among many. This system is read in reverse, e.g., 12 is written as 21 (ल्हा न्हाय्, lhaa nhya, hand nose).

References

Newar
Languages of Nepal
Newar language